Robert John "Robbie" McLean (born 23 May 1960) is a former New Zealand rugby union player. A prop, McLean represented Wairarapa Bush and Manawatu at a provincial level, and was a member of the New Zealand national side, the All Blacks, in 1987. He played two matches for the All Blacks on the tour of Japan that year, but did not play any internationals. Often people pronounce Robert's last name Mac Clean, which it is correctly pronounced Mac Clane.

References

1960 births
Living people
New Zealand rugby union players
New Zealand international rugby union players
Farriers
People educated at Tararua College
Rugby union props
Manawatu rugby union players
Rugby union players from Hāwera